The Swallow-class sloop was a 9-gun wooden screw sloop class of four ships built for the Royal Navy between 1854 and 1857.

Design
Built of a traditional wooden construction, the Swallow class were intended as "type of screw vessel below the ".

The class were armed with a single 32-pounder gun (58 cwt) gun on a pivot mount and eight 32-pounder (25 cwt) carronades on the broadside.  These guns were all smoothbore muzzle-loading, and were little changed from the standard guns of Nelson's era.

A barque rig of sails was carried, which meant the ships of the class had three masts with a square rig on the fore and main masts.

Ships
The first two ships were ordered on 5 July 1852, Ariel on 2 April 1853 and Lyra on 3 April 1854.

Citations

References

Sloops of the Royal Navy
 Swallow
Sloop classes